Olivia von Halle (née Falconer, born 1983) is a British fashion designer who runs "Olivia von Halle", a manufacturer of silk pyjamas.

Early life 
Von Halle was born in 1983 in Newcastle upon Tyne. She moved to  Fairseat, Kent  aged two and attended Tonbridge Grammar School for Girls and Combe Bank. After studying Fashion and Textile Management at Leeds University, Olivia von Halle worked for The Future Laboratory in London as a trend forecaster for clients including Louis Vuitton, Gucci Group and Lamborghini. In 2008 she moved to Shanghai, China where she continued working as a trend forecaster and as a luxury brand consultant.

Career 
von Halle initially worked as a trend forecaster at The Future Laboratory in London. She moved to Shanghai, China in 2008 where she continued working freelance for The Future Laboratory and WGSN. In 2010 von Halle appeared in an ITV documentary ‘Piers Morgan On...: Shanghai’.

In September 2011, von Halle launched her eponymous label at London Fashion Week. The collection is now stocked in over 50 stores in 13 countries including Harrods and Liberty in the UK, Neiman Marcus in the US and Tsum in Moscow.  The brand has been featured in global publications including Vogue, Vanity Fair, Harpers Bazaar,  Elle  and Tatler.

Awards 
In 2013, von Halle was announced as a ‘Walpole Brand of Tomorrow 2013’, in association with Mishcon de Reya.
von Halle was declared Lounge and Nightwear brand of the year at the UK Lingerie Awards during an awards ceremony at the Freemason’s Hall.
In 2013, von Halle was  awarded the Blue Butterfly Trust Mark for Positive Luxury for the company's strict corporate social responsibility program.

Family 

She is married to Hugo von Halle. The couple have two sons, Hieronymus Vladimir Azax and Dionysus Cosmo Chaos, and a daughter, Triptych Alabama Bliss.

References

External links

 Olivia von Halle

1983 births
Living people
English fashion designers
British women fashion designers
People from Newcastle upon Tyne
Alumni of the University of Leeds